The 2016-17 season was Aris Thessaloniki F.C. 3rd season in  Football League. They was also competing in the Greek Cup.

First team

Competitions

Overall

Overview

{| class="wikitable" style="text-align: center"
|-
!rowspan=2|Competition
!colspan=8|Record
|-
!
!
!
!
!
!
!
!
|-
| Football League

|-
| Greek Cup

|-
! Total

Managers' Overview

{| class="wikitable" style="text-align: center"
|-
!rowspan=2|Manager
!rowspan=2|Nat.
!rowspan=2|From
!rowspan=2|Until
!colspan=8|Record
|-
!
!
!
!
!
!
!
!
|-
| Nikos Anastopoulos
| 
| Start of Season
| 24 February 2017

|-
| Paschalis Melissas
| 
| 24 February 2017
| 28 February 2017

|-
| Nikos Kostenoglou
| 
| 28 February 2017
| End of Season

|-

Football League

League table

Results summary

Matches

Greek Cup 

Aris Thessaloniki entered the competition in the Group Stage, as a club from Football League.

Group stage

</noinclude><noinclude>

Matches

Round of 16

Squad statistics

Appearances

Goals

Clean sheets

References

External links
 Aris Thessaloniki F.C. official website

2016-17
Aris Thessaloniki F.C. season